Ahodwo is suburb of Kumasi. Kumasi is the regional capital of the Ashanti region of Ghana.  It is a residential area in the Kumasi Metropolitan Assembly. It is about 7 kilometres westwards from centre of the regional capital.

Notable place
The Ahodwo roundabout is a major intersection in the town. A giant horse statue is located in the roundabout's centre.

References

Populated places in Kumasi Metropolitan Assembly